Yang Jun-Xing is a Chinese herpetologist and ichthyologist with the Kunming Institute of Zoology. As of 2018, Yang  authored 9 species of fish and amphibians.

Publications (selection)
 Description of a new subspecies of the genus Saurogobio Bleeker (1870). Zoological Research (2002), 23 (4): 306–310.
 A new species of catfish of the genus Clupisoma (Siluriformes: Schilbeidae) from the Salween River, Yunnan, China. Copeia 2005: 566–570.
 Clarification of the nomenclatural status of Gymnodiptychus integrigymnatus (Cypriniformes, Cyprinidae). 2008. Zootaxa, 1897: 67–68.
 A new species of the genus Sinocyclocheilus (Teleostei: Cypriniformes), from Jinshajiang Drainage, Yunnan, China. 2015. Cave Research, 1(2): 4. 
 A new river loach from the main channel of the upper Mekong in Yunnan (Cypriniformes: Nemacheilidae). 2016. Zootaxa 4168(3): 594–600. 
 Paralepidocephalus translucens, a new species of loach from a cave in eastern Yunnan, China (Teleostei: Cobitidae). 2016. Ichthyological Exploration of Freshwaters, 27(1): 61–66.
 Garra incisorbis, a new species of labeonine from Pearl River basin in Guangxi, China (Teleostei: Cyprinidae). 2016. Ichthyological Exploration of Freshwaters, 26(4) [2015]: 299–303.
 A new freshwater stygobiotic calanoid (Copepoda: Speodiaptominae) from Yunnan, China. 2017. Zootaxa 4290(1): 192–200. 
 A new species of the genus Kurixalus from Yunnan, China (Anura, Rhacophoridae). 2017. ZooKeys 694: 71–93. 
 A new species of Kurixalus from western Yunnan, China (Anura, Rhacophoridae). 2018. Zookeys 770: 211–226.

Taxon described by him
See :Category:Taxa named by Yang Jun-Xing

References

External links 
 Data related to Yang Jun-Xing at Wikispecies

Living people
Chinese herpetologists
Chinese ichthyologists
1962 births
University of the Chinese Academy of Sciences alumni
Biologists from Guangdong
People's Republic of China science writers
Writers from Zhanjiang